People with the last name Michelet include the following. When used alone in an encyclopedic context, Michelet will generally refer to Jules.

Albert Michelet (1869–1928), French sailor and Olympian
Athénaïs Michelet (1826–1899), French natural history writer and memoirist
Åse Aulie Michelet (born 1952), Norwegian businessperson
Carl Johan Michelet (1826–1902), Norwegian lawyer and politician
Christian Frederik Michelet (1792–1874), Norwegian military officer
Christian Fredrik Michelet (businessman) (1891–1962), Norwegian military officer and businessperson
Christian Fredrik Michelet (major) (1860–1935), Norwegian military officer and equestrian
Christian Fredrik Michelet (politician) (1863–1927), Norwegian lawyer and politician
Edmond Michelet (1899–1970), French politician
Else Michelet (1942–2021), Norwegian journalist
Émile Michelet (1867–unknown), French sailor and Olympian
Jean Jacques Michelet, birth name of John Jacob Mickley (1697–1769), American settler
Jon Michelet (1944–2018), Norwegian novelist
Jørgen Michelet (1742–1818), Norwegian military officer
Jules Michelet (1798–1874), French historian
Karl Ludwig Michelet (1801–1893), German philosopher
Marie Michelet (1866–1951), Norwegian writer
Maren Michelet (1869–1932), American teacher and promoter of Scandinavian culture
Paul Michelet (1880–1958), Norwegian equestrian
Simon Michelet (1863–1942), Norwegian theologian

References